The DFSK C-Series is a series of light commercial vehicles (van and pickup trucks) manufactured by the Chinese automaker Dongfeng Sokon (DFSK), a joint venture between Dongfeng Motor Co., Ltd. and Chongqing Sokon Industry. The van models were first unveiled on September 21, 2009, whereas the pickup truck models were launched later. The van is available in three different models, the C35 (cargo van), the C36 (entry-level passenger van), and the C37 (passenger van). While the pickup is available in four different models, the single cab models are being the C31 and C51, while the double cab models were the C32 and C52.

Overview
The C-Series models are larger and more roomier with a longer wheelbase compared to the K-Series and V-Series models. The pricing ranges from RMB 46,900 to 59,800 yuan. The design of the C35, C36, and C37 vans are more controversial than the pickup trucks, as the front fascia and the side window graphics heavily resemble the facelifted third generation Ford Transit.

Van model variants 
The C35 represents the cargo van, and was launched in the second half of 2012 and features steel-sealed windows on the side and the tailgate. It is available with two variants, a traditional panel van with two seats and a crew van with five seats.

The C36 represents the entry-level passenger van with a low starting price. As the base trim, the C36 lacks some basic features, such as front fog lights, air conditioning, airbags, and features steel wheels instead of alloys. The C36 is available with two seating configurations, either a 5-seater or a 7-seater.

The C37 represents the mid-level passenger van, which includes the aforementioned features that are not present on the entry-level C36. Unlike the C36, the C37 is available with four seating configurations, depending on each market, this includes a 5-seater, a 7-seater, a 9-seater, or a 11-seater.

The C56 is the facelift variant sold from 2022. The facelift features a completely redesigned front end that sports horizontal headlamps and grilles.

Pickup model variants 
The pickup models feature a completely different cab design with nothing shared with the van models despite being sold under the C-Series range, while the headlamps and grilles are shared with the DFSK K-Series microvans. The single cab model was sold in Taiwan as the Sokon Gold Fulwin (金稳发) while the crew cab model was sold as the Grand Fulwin (大稳发) in Taiwan.

The C31 represents the single-cab pickup truck, which seats up to two passengers

The C32 represents the double-cab pickup truck with full 4-doors, it seats up to five passengers.

The C51 and C52 are essentially enlarged versions of the C31 and C32, both are slightly larger than the C31 and C32, offering with more cabin and cargo space.

The D-series heavy duty variant is based on the C-series pickup. Variants include the D51 and D52.

Slightly upmarket and larger pickup variants were introduced in 2022 with completely restyled cab designs called the C71 and C72. The D-series heavy duty variants with dually are called D71 and D72 respectively.

The C71 represents the single-cab pickup truck, which seats up to two passengers
The C72 represents the double-cab pickup truck with full 4-doors, it seats up to five passengers.

Ruichi electric vans
The electric versions of the C31, C35, and C36, known respectively as the EC31, EC35, and EC36 were unveiled in 2018 and sometimes sold under the Ruichi (瑞驰）badging. The EC35 is equipped with a 41.4 kWh battery delivering a range of 233 km (146 miles) via NEDC testing.

International markets

United Kingdom 
The C31, C32, C35 and C37 are also available in the United Kingdom since 2017. The brand was originally launched in the UK in 2012 but sales under the previous distributor ended before 2016.

Indonesia 

In Indonesia, the C-Series vans were sold as the DFSK Gelora. It was unveiled at the 2020 Gaikindo Indonesia International Commercial Vehicle Expo in March 5, 2020, and launched in November 2020 for the panel van, and January 2021 for the passenger van. The panel van is based on the C35, while the passenger van is based on the C36 and C37 respectively. The passenger version is only available in a 11-seater configuration. Both models were powered by a conventional 1.5-litre petrol engine, and locally built at DFSK's Cikande plant in Banten.

An electric version of the Gelora, the Gelora E, was also unveiled at the same show as the ICE-powered Gelora, and launched at the 28th Indonesia International Motor Show on April 15, 2021. Similar to the conventional model, it is available in a passenger van (based on the EC36) and panel van (based on the EC35) configurations, both models were powered by a single electric motor. The Gelora E was initially imported from China between 2021 to 2023, and later assembled in Indonesia since February 2023.

The Gelora E was one of the operational vehicles used for the 2022 G20 Bali Summit in Bali.

Later on the 2023 Indonesia International Motor Show, DFSK shows the Electric pick-up based on the EC31 configuration.

Romania 
The DFSK EC35 Cargovan is available in Romania from the "NEW CAR TRADING S.R.L." importer, located in Harghita County.

References

External links
  (C31 and C32)
 (C35 and C36)
 (C37)
 (C51 and C52)
 (EC36)

Cars introduced in 2009
2010s cars
2020s cars
Cars of China
Microvans
Minivans
Production electric cars